Mary Tregear, FBA (11 February 1924 – 17 December 2010) was a British museum curator and art historian specializing in Chinese art.

She was born in Wuchang, China. After studying at Bristol University and SOAS, University of London, she taught in the Central China University for three years. She was then a curator at Hong Kong University’s Fung Ping Shan Museum, also lecturing. In 1961 she joined the Ashmolean Museum, Oxford, where she was Assistant Keeper for the Chinese collection, and then Keeper of Eastern Art, 1987-1991.

She was a fellow of St Cross College, Oxford, a fellow of the British Academy, and President of the Oriental Ceramic Society from 1978 to 1980.

Main publications

Catalogue of Chinese Greenware, Ashmolean Museum, Oxford, 1976.
Chinese Ceramics in the Ashmolean Museum. An illustrated handbook to the collections, Ashmolean Museum, Oxford, 1979.
 Chinese Art, Thames and Hudson (World of Art series), London, 1980 and 2nd edn 1997 (still in print in 2017).
Song Ceramics, Thames and Hudson, London, 1982.
Kiln Sites of Ancient China (by Penelope Hughes-Stanton and Rose Kerr, ed. by Mary Tregear), Oriental Ceramic Society, 1980
Oriental Lacquer: Chinese and Japanese lacquer from the Ashmolean Museum(O.R. Impey and Mary Tregear), Ashmolean Museum, Oxford, 1983.

References

Sources
Obituary at Oxford Today

1924 births
2010 deaths
British curators
British art historians
Fellows of the British Academy
Women art historians
Alumni of SOAS University of London
Historians of East Asian art
British women historians
British expatriates in China
Fellows of St Cross College, Oxford